Robert James Higgins is an English former professional footballer who played as a central defender.

References

1958 births
Living people
English footballers
Association football defenders
Burnley F.C. players
Hartlepool United F.C. players
Rochdale A.F.C. players
Morecambe F.C. players
English Football League players